Theodora Goss (born September 30, 1968) is a Hungarian-American fiction writer and poet. Her writing has been nominated for major awards, including the Nebula, Locus, Mythopoeic,  World Fantasy, and Seiun Awards. Her short fiction and poetry have appeared in numerous magazines and anthologies, including Year's Best volumes.

Biography
Theodora Goss was born in Hungary and immigrated to the United States as a child.  She received her B.A. from the University of Virginia, a J.D. from Harvard Law School, and an M.A. and Ph.D. in English from Boston University She is also a graduate of the Odyssey and Clarion writing workshops, and sold her first published story, "The Rose in Twelve Petals," while a student at Clarion.

She teaches at Boston University and at the Stonecoast MFA Program in Creative Writing.

Career
She has been a contributor to many publications including, Apex Magazine, Clarkesworld Magazine, The Journal of Mythic Arts, Exotic Gothic, The Year's Best Fantasy and Horror, The Year's Best Fantasy, The Year's Best Science Fiction and Fantasy for Teens, Best New Fantasy, Polyphony, Realms of Fantasy, Alchemy, Strange Horizons and Lady Churchill's Rosebud Wristlet, and wrote an introduction to  Mike Allen's book Disturbing Muses.

Goss's debut novel, The Strange Case of the Alchemist's Daughter, was published by Saga Press in June 2017, and a sequel, European Travel for the Monstrous Gentlewoman, was published by Saga Press in July 2018.

Awards

Theodora Goss's writing has been nominated for the 2017 Locus Award for "Red as Blood and White as Bone," the 2015 Mythopoeic Award for "Songs for Ophelia", the 2011 Locus Award for "The Mad Scientist's Daughter," the 2008 Mythopoeic Award for "In the Forest of Forgetting", the 2007 Nebula Award for "Pip and the Fairies", and the 2005 World Fantasy Award for Best Short Fiction for "The Wings of Meister Wilhelm".

She won the 2017 Rhysling Award for Best Long Poem for "Rose Child" and the 2004 Rhysling Award for Best Long Poem for "Octavia is Lost in the Hall of Masks". In 2008, her story "Singing of Mount Abora" won the World Fantasy Award for Best Short Fiction.

Her 2017 novel The Strange Case of the Alchemist's Daughter was a nominee for the 2018 Nebula Award and the 2018 Compton Crook Award for best first novel.

Her 2019 short story "How to Become a Witch-Queen" was nominated for the 2020 Shirley Jackson Award for short fiction.

Works

Books

The Extraordinary Adventures of the Athena Club
The Strange Case of the Alchemist's Daughter, Saga Press (2017); Simon & Schuster Audio  June 2017.
European Travel for the Monstrous Gentlewoman, Saga Press (release date 10 July 2018); Simon & Schuster Audio (release date 10 July 2018)
The Sinister Mystery of the Mesmerizing Girl, Saga Press (release date 1 October 2019); Simon & Schuster Audio (release date 1 October 2019)

Other books
Snow White Learns Witchcraft: Stories and Poems (collection), Mythic Delirium Books (2019)
The Thorn and the Blossom: A Two-Sided Love Story, with Scott Mckowen, Quirk Books  (2012) 
In the Forest of Forgetting (collection), Prime Books (2006).  Some of the stories in this volume were previously published in The Rose in Twelve Petals & Other Stories.

Books edited
Voices from Fairyland: The Fantastical Poems of Mary Coleridge, Charlotte Mew and Sylvia Townsend Warner, Aqueduct Press (2008)
(with Delia Sherman) Interfictions: An Anthology of Interstitial Writing, Interstitial Arts Foundation (2007)

Short fiction
"How to Become a Witch-Queen," Hex Life: Wicked New Tales of Witchery, 2019.
"Snow, Blood, Fur" Daily Science Fiction, November 17, 2017.
"Come See the Living Dryad," Tor.com, March 9, 2017.
"To Budapest, With Love," Uncanny Magazine, 14, January/February 2017.
"The Other Thea," The Starlit Wood, 2016.
"Red as Blood and White as Bone," Tor.com, May 4, 2016.
"In Autumn," Daily Science Fiction, November 13, 2015.
"Cimmeria: From the Journal of Imaginary Anthropology," Lightspeed Magazine, July 2014.
"Elena's Egg," Exotic Gothic 5, 2013.
"Blanchefleur," Once Upon a Time: New Fairy Tales, 2013.
"Lost Girls of Oz," Oz Reimagined: New Tales from the Emerald City and Beyond, 2013.
"Estella Saves the Village," Queen Victoria's Book of Spells, 2013.
"England under the White Witch," Clarkesworld Magazine, 73, October 2012. 
"Beautiful Boys," Asimov's Science Fiction, August 2012. 
"Woola's Song," Under the Moons of Mars, 2012.
"Christopher Raven," Ghosts by Gaslight, 2011. 
"Pug," Asimov's Science Fiction, July 2011. 
"Fair Ladies," Apex Magazine, August 2010. 
"The Mad Scientist's Daughter," Strange Horizons, January 2010. 
"Child-Empress of Mars," Interfictions 2, 2009. 
"Csilla's Story," Other Earths, April 2009.
"The Puma," Apex Magazine, March 2009. 
"Her Mother's Ghosts," Clarkesworld Magazine, 23, August 2008. 
"Catherine and the Satyr," Strange Horizons, October 2007. 
"Princess Lucinda and the Hound of the Moon," Realms of Fantasy, June 2007. 
"Singing of Mount Abora," Logorrhea: Good Words Make Good Stories, 2007.
"Letters from Budapest," Alchemy 3, May 2006. 
"Lessons with Miss Gray," Fantasy Magazine, 2, April 2006. 
"Death Comes for Ervina," Polyphony 5, November 2005.
"Pip and the Fairies," Strange Horizons, October 2005. 
"A Statement in the Case," Realms of Fantasy, August 2005. 
"The Belt," Flytrap 4, May 2005.
"The Wings of Meister Wilhelm," Polyphony 4, September 2004. 
"Miss Emily Gray," Alchemy 2, August 2004. 
"Lily, with Clouds," Alchemy 1, December 2003. 
"Sleeping with Bears," Strange Horizons, November 2003.
"In the Forest of Forgetting," Realms of Fantasy, October 2003.
"Professor Berkowitz Stands on the Threshold," Polyphony 2, April 2003. 
"The Rapid Advance of Sorrow," Lady Churchill's Rosebud Wristlet, 11, November 2002.
"The Rose in Twelve Petals," Realms of Fantasy, April 2002.

References

External links
 Author's official website
 Theodora Goss at Stonecoast MFA in Creative Writing (U. Southern Maine) site.
 Interview: Theodora Goss: Shifting Ground (Locus, May 2008). 
 Writing My Mother's Ghosts (Essay, Clarkesworld Magazine Aug. 2008)
 Interview (Clarkesworld Magazine, Dec. 2010)

Living people
21st-century American novelists
21st-century American short story writers
American fantasy writers
American short story writers
Women science fiction and fantasy writers
American women short story writers
Rhysling Award for Best Long Poem winners
World Fantasy Award-winning writers
Harvard Law School alumni
American women novelists
Hungarian emigrants to the United States
University of Virginia alumni
1968 births
21st-century American women writers